The Eastern Province Elephants (known as the Multisure Eastern Province Elephants for sponsorship reasons) are a South African rugby union team that participates in the annual Currie Cup and Rugby Challenge competitions. They are governed by the Eastern Province Rugby Union (EPRU or EP Rugby). The team represents the Western half of the Eastern Cape province, and they play their home games at the Nelson Mandela Bay Stadium in Port Elizabeth.

In February 2018, the EPRU announced that the name of the team would revert to Eastern Province Elephants for the 2018 season.

History

The Eastern Province Rugby Football Union was founded in 1888. The team was originally a representative team, drawing players from within the provincial union area's local clubs.

Professionalism and Super Rugby

However, with the advent of professionalism in rugby union in 1995, the team contracted players from various areas. The Eastern Province Elephants is a professional team run by the EPRU, who are also responsible for junior representative rugby teams and administrative matters in the region.

Prior to 2010, they were known as the Mighty Elephants, but in order to align themselves with the Super Rugby side the Southern Kings, who were also governed by the EPRU, they changed their name to Eastern Province Kings. After the 2010 World Cup, they moved their offices to the new Port Elizabeth Stadium to establish their new headquarters.

Financial problems and liquidation

After late payments of player salaries throughout most of the 2015 season, it came to a head in November 2015, when the EPRU failed to meet a final deadline imposed by the South African Rugby Players Association. All players' contracts were declared null and void, leading to an exodus of players. A few days later, the South African Rugby Union announced that they would take control of the affiliated Southern Kings Super Rugby franchise, and released an operational plan in early December which indicated that SARU would operate the franchise independently from the Eastern Province Kings.

After a petition handed to president Cheeky Watson, in which players announced their refusal to play for the Eastern Province Kings or Southern Kings until certain issues were sorted out, was not met, the South African Rugby Players' Association submitted a liquidation application in January 2016 against EP Rugby (Pty) Ltd on behalf of eighteen Eastern Province Kings players who were not included in the Southern Kings Super Rugby squad for 2016 and have not received their salaries since September 2015. The Port Elizabeth High Court provisionally liquidated Eastern Province Rugby in March 2016 and imposed a deadline of 10 May 2016 to pay outstanding player salaries, before the liquidation order would being made final.

The Eastern Province Kings submitted details of a rescue package to the High Court in May 2016, which saw the liquidation order being postponed until 4 August 2016. In July 2016, it emerged that the rescue package would not come to fruition and SARU withdrew their appeal against the final liquidation order. On 4 August 2016, the High Court ruled that the Eastern Province Kings should be liquidated.

Within hours of the liquidation being finalised, SARU released a statement that an Eastern Province Kings team funded by the Nelson Mandela Bay Municipality would continue to participate in the 2016 Currie Cup Premier Division.

Stadium

The team was originally based at St George's Park. This was also where the very first South African Rugby and Cricket Tests took place. They shared the ground with the Eastern Province cricket team.

In 1959, the EPRU decided to move the team to the then named Boet Erasmus Stadium and the inauguration took place in 1960 with the test between the Springboks and Scotland on 30 April 1960. The stadium was later named Telkom Park, due to a naming rights deal, and then renamed to the current name, the EPRU Stadium. The team played most home matches at the stadium, with a few hosted at other venues in Port Elizabeth and surrounding towns. During the late 2000s, the team shared the stadium with football (soccer) club Bay United.

In 2009, the team played its first match at their current home, the Nelson Mandela Bay Stadium.

Honours
The team's major tournament wins include the 2002 Vodacom Shield, 2010 Currie Cup First Division and 2012 Currie Cup First Division.

Results by season
The table below indicates the Elephants' recent finishes. This includes games played as Eastern Province, Eastern Province Kings and Mighty Elephants.

1 Between 2000 and 2002, the top 4 in each section qualified for the Top 8 tournament, the bottom 3 in each section for the Bankfin Cup.2 In 2005, the top 4 in each section qualified for the Premier Division, the bottom 3 in each section for the First Division.

1 Between 2001 and 2002, the top 4 in each section qualified for the Vodacom Top 8 tournament, the bottom 3 in each section for the Vodacom Shield.

Current season

Current squad

The following players were included in the Eastern Province Elephants squad for the 2022 Currie Cup First Division:

Team officials

Records

Eastern Province Elephants records:

References

External links
 Official website

 
South African rugby union teams
Sport in Port Elizabeth